Above & Beyond are an electronic music group consisting of English DJs Jono Grant, Tony McGuinness and Finnish DJ  Paavo Siljamäki. Formed in 2000, they are the owners of London-based electronic dance music labels Anjunabeats and Anjunadeep, and also host a weekly radio show titled Group Therapy Radio. The trio has been consistently ranked among DJ Magazine's Top 100 DJs Poll, having placed at No. 6 in 2007, No. 4 in 2008 & 2009, No. 5 in 2010 & 2011, No. 51 in 2018, No. 22 in 2019,  No. 19 in 2020, No. 21 in 2021, and most recently No. 30 in 2022.

History

Formation (1999–2000)
Grant and Siljamäki met at the University of Westminster. Having discovered a common mutual interest for electronic music, they decided to collaborate in writing music together. Following Siljamäki's suggestion, they set up the Anjunabeats label in the summer of 1999 with the release of their first single, "Volume One", under the alias Anjunabeats. Initially, the Anjunabeats record label was founded as a medium to release their own music. Since the label acquired the same name as their production alias, however, they started to release music under different names, most notably as Dirt Devils and Free State.

The original mix of "Volume One", packaged with their Tease Dub Mix, received immediate attention in various dance clubs and quickly gained support from DJs such as Pete Tong, Paul Oakenfold, Judge Jules, and Paul van Dyk, after Grant and Paavo Siljamäki personally handed a dub plate of the song to Paul Oakenfold in 2000 at Home, the now-defunct London nightclub.

Following the success of "Volume One" and a string of singles and remixes under their Free State and Dirt Devils alter egos, the marketing director & manager of Warner Music Group, Tony McGuinness, was alerted to the duo by his brother, Liam McGuinness. Liam had purchased a sample library that Grant had created for Yamaha and got in touch with Jono. Having been commissioned to remix Chakra's "Home", Tony McGuinness recruited Grant and Siljamäki to help him complete the remix. When the group was searching for a name to use for their Chakra remix, the inspiration came from a web page belonging to an American motivational trainer coincidentally named Jono Grant. Grant had the poster stuck to his wall. The slogan used by the motivational trainer was "Above & Beyond", and they decided to use that as their name. Although the group was relatively unknown at the time, their remix of Chakra's "Home" was picked over remixes by Rob Searle and Tilt to be the A-side mix, and, after plays by Pete Tong on BBC Radio 1, it reached number one in the UK club charts.

In addition to Above & Beyond's production work, the trio also established the vocal trance group OceanLab with Justine Suissa.

Other collaborators in the band's early stages include Andy Moor and vocalists Carrie Skipper, Ashley Tomberlin, Zoë Johnston, and Richard Bedford.

Early productions and DJ career debut (2001–2005)

Interest in Above & Beyond soon emerged from established trance labels and new remixes were requested: the trio remixed Aurora's "Ordinary World", Fragma's "Everytime You Need Me", Perpetuous Dreamer's "The Sound of Goodbye", and Adamski's "In the City". These tracks served as the foundation for Above & Beyond's reputation as one of the UK's leading vocal trance remixers.

In 2001, Above & Beyond produced a club mix for Madonna's single "What It Feels Like for a Girl", and also remixed select tracks by Delerium, Three Drives, and J-pop artist Ayumi Hamasaki.

In 2002, Above & Beyond made their DJ debut in Tokyo performing for 8,000 clubbers alongside Ferry Corsten and Tiësto. As their fan base increased, the trio began to make regular appearances at some of the world's largest music festivals and clubs, including Rockness, Glastonbury and Creamfields in the UK and Amnesia in Ibiza, Spain.

In 2003, Above & Beyond remixed DJ Tomcraft's "Loneliness", Motorcycle's "As the Rush Comes", as well as being asked back by Madonna to remix "Nobody Knows Me". Other remixes included Britney Spears' single "Everytime", Dido's "Sand in My Shoes", and Delerium's "Silence".

Above & Beyond's single "No One On Earth", featuring the vocals of Zoë Johnston, soon followed. The Gabriel & Dresden Remix of this song was voted Tune of the Year for 2004 in Armin van Buuren's trance radio show A State of Trance.

In 2004, OceanLab's fourth single, "Satellite", was released. Known to be one of their break-through tracks in the early days of producing, it reached No. 19 on the UK chart in May 2004.

Tri-State era (2006–2009)
In 2006, Above & Beyond released their debut artist album, Tri-State. UK-based DJ Magazine gave the album a five-star review, saying, "A blend of sleek electronic rhythms, lush filmic textures and old-fashioned song writing. Tri-State is the fulfillment of any dance act's ultimate album aspiration: a padding-free, skilled, diverse long-player. In a word, 'Brilliant.'"

Singles from the album include "Air for Life", with Andy Moor, which won Best Underground Dance Track at the 2006 Miami Winter Music Conference and was named Tune of the Year for 2005, as voted by the listeners of Armin van Buuren's radio show A State of Trance. "Alone Tonight", featuring Richard Bedford, was nominated for best progressive house/trance track at the 22nd International Dance Music Awards held at the 2007 Miami WMC, reaching No. 4 in the Finland National Singles chart and No. 5 in the UK Dance Chart. Above & Beyond performed "Alone Tonight" at the Global Gathering 2005 broadcast live on Radio One in the UK. Their single "Can't Sleep" was included on A State of Trance's episode 280, which featured at No. 3 on the best 20 tracks of 2006, according to the fans that voted in its polls. The Above & Beyond Club Mix of their track "Good for Me", featuring Zoë Johnston, was also voted Tune of the Year in 2006 on Van Buuren's A State of Trance. In 2008, Above & Beyond won Best Underground Dance Track at the IDMA Awards at the Winter Music Conference with their Above & Beyond Club Mix of their single "Home".

On 31 December 2007, Above & Beyond unofficially hosted their largest show ever on Barra Beach, Rio de Janeiro, where they reportedly played to an estimated one million people.

In 2009, Above & Beyond performed at the official launch of Virgin Galactic's SpaceShipTwo. The event took place in the Mojave Desert and was hosted by Sir Richard Branson and attended by Arnold Schwarzenegger. The performance was secured after Above & Beyond's Buzz Aldrin-sampling club track "Buzz" was picked by Virgin to soundtrack the unveiling of the spaceship.

Group Therapy era (2010–2014)

The first single to be heard from Above & Beyond's second artist album, Group Therapy, was "Thing Called Love", featuring vocals from Richard Bedford. It is featured in the Anjunabeats Volume 8 compilation album released on 19 July 2010. After months of writing, refining, and perfecting, the hugely anticipated album Group Therapy was released to widespread critical acclaim on 6 June 2011. Hitting No. 1 in the iTunes Dance Album charts, the album was also hugely well received by the dance music press. DJ Magazine put the three members of Above & Beyond on the cover of their May issue, describing them as the "biggest DJ/production collective the UK has ever produced." Mixmag hailed the album as "Artist Album of the Year". The album contains downtempo moments, such as the classical piano-influenced opening track "Filmic" and the reflective "Only a Few Things", featuring Zoë Johnston, as well as more uptempo club tracks such as "Sun & Moon", "Thing Called Love", and "Prelude". All songs are written and produced by Above & Beyond, with Richard Bedford and Zoë Johnston providing vocals.

The first official radio single from the album, "Sun & Moon", featuring vocals from Richard Bedford, became a favorite of BBC Radio 1 personality Vernon Kay and ended up on the station's B-List, an achievement that was also followed by their second radio single, "Thing Called Love", which also featured Richard Bedford. "Thing Called Love" was also featured during an episode of the MTV drama Teen Wolf. In 2017, Billboard named "Sun & Moon" the number-one saddest dance music song of all-time.

In 2012, Above & Beyond embarked on its Group Therapy World Tour, performing sold-out shows at select venues and clubs across North America, Europe, Asia and Australia. The group also made their debut in Hawaii, performing at the Kaka’ako Waterfront Park in Honolulu. In August 2012, Above & Beyond appeared on the cover of Mixmag and performed a live set at Mixmag Headquarters along with Mat Zo. The 2-hour set was subsequently released as an exclusive label showcase mix titled United Colours of Anjunabeats.

In 2013, Above & Beyond continued to headline and perform at several dance music festivals, including Ultra Music Festival, Electric Daisy Carnival, Electric Forest, Tomorrowland and Stereosonic. The group also performed their first-ever acoustic shows at Porchester Hall in London and The Greek Theater in Los Angeles, featuring Zoë Johnston, Alex Vargas and Annie Drury, among other special guests including Skrillex. On 26 October 2013, Above & Beyond celebrated Episode 050 of Group Therapy Radio (their 500th radio show overall) at Alexandra Palace in London with a live 6-hour broadcast.

On 18 October 2014, Above & Beyond celebrated Episode 100 of Group Therapy Radio at Madison Square Garden in New York City with a live broadcast. Ilan Bluestone opened the show, followed by Andrew Bayer and Mat Zo, respectively. Above & Beyond then took the stage and performed a 2-hour set. During the set, they debuted new music from their up-and-coming album We Are All We Need. The previous day, 17 October, Above & Beyond had debuted the new video for the title track of We Are All We Need in Times Square. They narrowly missed arrest when, after inviting fans to come out and view the video, hundreds turned out in droves. Police on horseback were summoned to the location, as traffic was beginning to become blocked.

Acoustic, We Are All We Need, and Acoustic II (2014–2016)
Following acoustic shows in London and Los Angeles, Above & Beyond premiered the concert film Live From Porchester Hall on 24 January 2014 across the world. Then the album, Acoustic, was released on 28 January 2014. Tony McGuinness wrote:

A special edition of Acoustic was also released, containing a DVD of the concert film in London, a photographic journal, and signed commentary from all members of the band. A limited press double vinyl edition was later released on 17 March 2014.

During their acoustic shows at Porchester Hall, Above & Beyond announced that their third artist album would be released sometime in 2014. Vocalists Alex Vargas and Justine Suissa have been confirmed as collaborators on new material.

On 14 October 2014, Above & Beyond announced their third studio album, We Are All We Need, which was released on 19 January 2015 (20 January 2015 in the US & Canada).

On 26 September 2015, the group announced that a second acoustic album, Acoustic II, would be released on 3 June 2016. A world tour with dates across Europe, North America, and Australia was scheduled in support of the new material. The tour featured artists Zoë Johnston, Justine Suissa, Cobi, and Natalie Holmes.

Common Ground and Flow State (2017–present) 
On 4 August 2017, Above & Beyond released the single "Tightrope" featuring Marty Longstaff. Then on 8 September 2017, Above & Beyond released the single "My Own Hymn" featuring long-time collaborator Zoë Johnston. On 3 November 2017, the single "Northern Soul" was released, becoming the first Above & Beyond single to feature Richard Bedford on vocals since "Black Room Boy" in 2013. On 19 January 2018, the trio released the single "Always", which is a piano-driven ballad featuring Zoë Johnston. A music video which features the artists performing the single on top of a French Alps mountain was released together on the same day.

The album Common Ground was released on 26 January 2018 through Anjunabeats, containing the aforementioned singles "Tightrope", "My Own Hymn", "Northern Soul" and "Always".

On 15 May 2018, the group released "Red Rocks" which was inspired by the Red Rocks Amphitheatre structure in Colorado. Their next single, "Rocket Science", was released on 7 September 2018 and was previously debuted in front of 23,000 listeners at their 2017 Gorge Amphitheatre performance. The group wrote in a joint statement that the track began as an experiment trying out a new DAW, which they enjoyed working with.

In June 2019, the group announced their fifth album, Flow State, which was released on 19 July 2019, and is an entirely ambient album.

Radio shows
Above & Beyond produce a weekly show, and have produced several radio shows since 2004, including Anjunabeats Worldwide. Currently, Above & Beyond produce a weekly radio show called Group Therapy Radio in which the trio take turns hosting the weekly show. The show lasts for two hours, where the last half an hour is filled with a guest mix by a guest DJ. Group Therapy is broadcast every Friday at 7pm UTC +1. It is broadcast on several media, including YouTube, Twitch and as of late Facebook.

Trance Around the World (2004–2012)
Trance Around the World was a weekly radio show comprising a total number of 450 episodes from 2004 to 2012. It reached an audience of 30 million listeners in 35 countries weekly, making it one of the most listened to radio shows in the world. TATW also served as a platform to promote new artists on Above & Beyond's renowned Anjunabeats label. There have been various special episodes of TATW, including live Above & Beyond sets from festivals and radio episodic milestones, such as Episode 400, which was celebrated in November 2011 in Beirut, Lebanon. Trance Around the World ended its nine-year broadcast in November 2012, celebrating Episode 450 in Bangalore, India.

Group Therapy Radio (2012–present)
On 5 November 2012, Above & Beyond announced the launch of Group Therapy Radio, successor to Trance Around the World. Episode 001 was broadcast concurrently during Trance Around the World, Episode 450 in Bangalore, India. Every 50 episodes is celebrated, by hosting a big show. These shows are held in a different country every time. ABGT 50 was held on 26 October 2013 at Alexandra Palace, London. ABGT 100  took place in Madison Square Garden in NYC. On 26 September 2015, Above & Beyond held their 150th episode of Group Therapy Radio through their mainstage event at Sydney, Australia at the Allphones Arena. ABGT 200 took place on 24 September 2016 at the Ziggo Dome in Amsterdam. On 16 and 17 September 2017, Above & Beyond held ABGT 250 at The Gorge Amphitheatre in George, Washington, marking the first multi-day ABGT show. On 29 September 2018, ABGT 300 was held in Hong Kong at the AsiaWorld-Expo, featuring performances from other Anjunabeats artists such as Ben Böhmer, Spencer Brown, ilan Bluestone, and Andrew Bayer. ABGT 350 was held at the O2 Arena in Prague on 11 October 2019. ABGT400 was held on 26 September 2020, and due to the COVID-19 Pandemic, was a virtual event, which Above & Beyond livestreamed from London. The set celebrated 20 years of their label Anjunabeats and featured mostly older songs. ABGT 450 was held on 4 September 2021 at The Drumsheds, London, after an 18-month hiatus of in-person concerts due to COVID-19. On 10 September 2021 with ABGT 451, the show officially became longer-running than Trance Around the World. After ABGT 450, a 15-20 minute mix of "Radio Highlights" replaced the full 2-hour podcast/radio show on many streaming platforms like IHeartRadio, Spotify, Audacy and ITunes. The conventional 2-hour mix, however, continued on YouTube, SoundCloud, Mixcloud and Apple Music (via RSS feed) and is also broadcast as a radio show to stations in more than 30 countries globally.
On March 28, 2022, it was announced that ABGT 500 will be held on October 15, 2022 in Los Angeles, USA.

Other radio appearances
Since 2004, Above & Beyond have appeared numerous times on BBC Radio 1's Essential Mix. In 2004 and 2011, their guest mixes were voted as Essential Mix of the Year. On 24 January 2014, the group was inducted into Pete Tong's Hall of Fame. They are the only artist to have ever won the Essential Mix of the Year twice. In 2018, the group did a guest mix for "Metropolis," a Saturday night show that airs on Los Angeles' KCRW. KCRW also did an interview with them in 2014 for their acoustic tour.

Discography

Studio albums
Tri-State (2006)
Group Therapy (2011)
We Are All We Need (2015)
Common Ground (2018)
Flow State (2019)

As OceanLab
Sirens of the Sea (2008)

Awards and nominations
List of awards and nominations received by Above & Beyond.

A State of Trance

BBC Radio

Beatport Music Awards

DJ Awards (Ibiza)

DJ Magazine

Top 100 DJs ranking

Grammy Awards

International Dance Music Awards

Mixmag

NRJ DJ Awards

See also
 Anjunabeats
 OceanLab

References

External links

 
 
 Anjunabeats website

Musical groups established in 2000
2000 establishments in England
British electronic music groups
Club DJs
DJs from London
British trance music groups
Electronic dance music DJs
Anjunabeats artists
Armada Music artists
British musical trios